Rovny (masculine), Rovnaya (feminine), or Rovnoye (neuter) is the name of several inhabited localities in Russia.

Amur Oblast
As of 2022, one rural locality in Amur Oblast bears this name:
Rovnoye, Amur Oblast, a selo in Volkovsky Rural Settlement of Blagoveshchensky District

Belgorod Oblast
As of 2022, one rural locality in Belgorod Oblast bears this name:
Rovnoye, Belgorod Oblast, a settlement in Nasonovsky Rural Okrug of Valuysky District

Kaliningrad Oblast
As of 2022, two rural localities in Kaliningrad Oblast bear this name:
Rovnoye, Gvardeysky District, Kaliningrad Oblast, a settlement in Znamensky Rural Okrug of Gvardeysky District
Rovnoye, Pravdinsky District, Kaliningrad Oblast, a settlement under the administrative jurisdiction of Pravdinsk Town of District Significance of Pravdinsky District

Khabarovsk Krai
As of 2022, one rural locality in Khabarovsk Krai bears this name:
Rovnoye, Khabarovsk Krai, a selo in Khabarovsky District

Krasnodar Krai
As of 2022, one rural locality in Krasnodar Krai bears this name:
Rovny, Krasnodar Krai, a settlement in Stepnyansky Rural Okrug of Kushchyovsky District

Krasnoyarsk Krai
As of 2022, one rural locality in Krasnoyarsk Krai bears this name:
Rovnoye, Krasnoyarsk Krai, a selo in Rovnensky Selsoviet of Balakhtinsky District

Kurgan Oblast
As of 2022, one rural locality in Kurgan Oblast bears this name:
Rovnaya, a selo in Rovnensky Selsoviet of Ketovsky District

Kursk Oblast
As of 2022, two rural localities in Kursk Oblast bear this name:
Rovnoye, Gorshechensky District, Kursk Oblast, a selo in Bykovsky Selsoviet of Gorshechensky District
Rovnoye, Khomutovsky District, Kursk Oblast, a settlement in Bolshealeshnyansky Selsoviet of Khomutovsky District

Leningrad Oblast
As of 2022, one rural locality in Leningrad Oblast bears this name:
Rovnoye, Leningrad Oblast, a logging depot settlement in Krasnoselskoye Settlement Municipal Formation of Vyborgsky District

Republic of Mordovia
As of 2022, one rural locality in the Republic of Mordovia bears this name:
Rovny, Republic of Mordovia, a settlement in Ryazanovsky Selsoviet of Staroshaygovsky District

Nizhny Novgorod Oblast
As of 2022, one rural locality in Nizhny Novgorod Oblast bears this name:
Rovny, Nizhny Novgorod Oblast, a settlement in Strelsky Selsoviet of Vadsky District

Novgorod Oblast
As of 2022, two rural localities in Novgorod Oblast bear this name:
Rovnoye, Yegolskoye Settlement, Borovichsky District, Novgorod Oblast, a village in Yegolskoye Settlement of Borovichsky District
Rovnoye, Zhelezkovskoye Settlement, Borovichsky District, Novgorod Oblast, a village in Zhelezkovskoye Settlement of Borovichsky District

Orenburg Oblast
As of 2022, one rural locality in Orenburg Oblast bears this name:
Rovny, Orenburg Oblast, a settlement in Uralsky Selsoviet of Kuvandyksky District

Perm Krai
As of 2022, one rural locality in Perm Krai bears this name:
Rovny, Perm Krai, a khutor in Vereshchaginsky District

Pskov Oblast
As of 2022, seven rural localities in Pskov Oblast bear this name:
Rovnoye, Dedovichsky District, Pskov Oblast, a village in Dedovichsky District
Rovnoye (Ivanovskaya Rural Settlement), Nevelsky District, Pskov Oblast, a village in Nevelsky District; municipally, a part of Ivanovskaya Rural Settlement of that district
Rovnoye (Plisskaya Rural Settlement), Nevelsky District, Pskov Oblast, a village in Nevelsky District; municipally, a part of Plisskaya Rural Settlement of that district
Rovnoye (Ust-Dolysskaya Rural Settlement), Nevelsky District, Pskov Oblast, a village in Nevelsky District; municipally, a part of Ust-Dolysskaya Rural Settlement of that district
Rovnoye, Novorzhevsky District, Pskov Oblast, a village in Novorzhevsky District
Rovnoye, Ostrovsky District, Pskov Oblast, a village in Ostrovsky District
Rovnoye, Strugo-Krasnensky District, Pskov Oblast, a village in Strugo-Krasnensky District

Ryazan Oblast
As of 2022, one rural locality in Ryazan Oblast bears this name:
Rovnoye, Ryazan Oblast, a village in Rovnovsky Rural Okrug of Ryazansky District

Samara Oblast
As of 2022, one rural locality in Samara Oblast bears this name:
Rovny, Samara Oblast, a settlement in Sergiyevsky District

Saratov Oblast
As of 2022, two inhabited localities in Saratov Oblast bear this name.

Urban localities
Rovnoye, Saratov Oblast, a work settlement in Rovensky District

Rural localities
Rovny, Saratov Oblast, a settlement in Novouzensky District

Stavropol Krai
As of 2022, two rural localities in Stavropol Krai bear this name:
Rovny, Kursky District, Stavropol Krai, a settlement in Kursky Selsoviet of Kursky District
Rovny, Stepnovsky District, Stavropol Krai, a khutor in Verkhnestepnovsky Selsoviet of Stepnovsky District

Tver Oblast
As of 2022, two rural localities in Tver Oblast bear this name:
Rovnoye, Rameshkovsky District, Tver Oblast, a village in Rameshkovsky District
Rovnoye, Zubtsovsky District, Tver Oblast, a village in Zubtsovsky District